Florentin Durand (born 9 November 1982) is a French ski jumper. He competed in the large hill event at the 2002 Winter Olympics.

References

External links
 

1982 births
Living people
French male ski jumpers
Olympic ski jumpers of France
Ski jumpers at the 2002 Winter Olympics
People from Saint-Martin-d'Hères
Sportspeople from Isère